The 2000 Legg Mason Tenis Classic was the 31st edition of the Washington Open and was played on outdoor hard courts.  The tournament was part of the International Series Gold of the 2000 ATP Tour. It was held at the William H.G. FitzGerald Tennis Center in Washington, D.C. from August 14 through August 20, 2000.

Finals

Singles

 Àlex Corretja defeated  Andre Agassi, 6–2, 6–3
It was Corretja's 4th singles title of the year and the 13th of his career.

Doubles

 Alex O'Brien /  Jared Palmer defeated  Andre Agassi /  Sargis Sargsian, 7–5, 6–1
 It was O'Brien's 2nd title of the year and the 13th of his career. It was Palmer's 3rd title of the year and the 16th of his career.

References

External links
 Official website 
 ATP tournament profile

Legg Mason Tennis Classic
Washington Open (tennis)
Legg Mason Tennis Classic
2000 in American tennis